The 242nd Training Centre of the Airborne Forces (242 TC VDV) is a brigade-sized training formation of the Russian Airborne Troops.

History

Cold War 
To prepare sergeants and junior specialists for airborne units in accordance with a directive of the Commander Soviet Ground Forces, the 44th Training Airborne Division was formed in July–October 1960 in Ostrov and Cheryokha, in Pskov Oblast. The Deputy Commander of the Airborne Troops, Lieutenant-General Vasily Margelov, supervised the division's formation. The formation's birthday is 17 September, when the formation of the division was completed and Major General N.G. Zharenov assumed command. The division was formed from the 17th Airborne Training Centre at Dyatkovo, the 78th Separate Self-Propelled Artillery Training Battalion at Kaunas, and the 11th School for Junior Specialists of the Medical Service at Ostrov.

The vast majority of officers had experience in training units of the regimental schools, which had been disbanded at the same time. Among the officers selected to staff the training centre were 131 veterans of the Great Patriotic War.

The division consisted of three training Airborne Regiments; 301st and 304th Training Airborne Regiments - Ostrov, 302 - Cheryokha, a training artillery regiment (1120th, Ostrov) and other units.

The division's regiments were the heirs of the regiments with the corresponding World War II numbers: 301st and 304th were part of the 100th Guards Airborne Division/Rifle Division, and the 302nd had been part of the 98th Guards Airborne Division/Rifle Division. However, for unclear reasons, the division was soon renamed the 44th. Also the regiment numbering changed: instead of, respectively, the 302nd and 304th, the 226th and 285th regiments appeared (no longer associated historically with the VDV).

While it was not clear whether the division was formed as a Guards formation, when it became the 44th, it was not just not a Guards formation, but the only non-Guards formation in the Soviet Airborne Forces. The regiments were not Guards units either.

In September 1961, available stocks, weapons, military equipment, and the bulk of the division were moved to the Lithuanian SSR. The Divisional Headquarters and the 301st Regiment were established at Gaižiūnai, the 304th Regiment at Rukla (8 km south-east of Jonava), and the 1120th Training Artillery Regiment in the city of Prienai (28 km south of Kaunas). 

On 15 May 1972, the 332nd School for Praporshchiks was formed in Gaižiūnai from the 226th Training Airborne Regiment.  On 1 December 1987 in accordance with the order of the Ministry of Defence of the Soviet Union of 18 August 1987, the 44th Training Airborne Division was renamed the 242nd Airborne Training Centre.

Russian Airborne Troops 
In accordance with the directive of the Defense Ministry on 13 November 1992, the Airborne Training Centre was removed from the Republic of Lithuania to Omsk in Russian territory. Shortly after the relocation, the 301st Training Airborne Regiment was disbanded, and the 1120th Training Artillery Regiment was moved to Ishim in Tyumen Oblast. The training centre headquarters is currently located in the village of Svetloe ('Bright') in the Omsk Oblast. In the years since its relocation to Omsk the formerly division-sized formation has shrunk to the size of a brigade.

In July 2015, a barracks of the centre in the village of Svetloe collapsed, killing 23. Colonel Oleg Ponomarev, who commanded the centre at the time, was arrested. Colonel Arkady Furdeyev replaced him in command of the centre in late August.

Notes

Russian-language source on 242nd Training Centre

References

Further reading
 Schofield, Carey, The Russian Elite: Inside Spetsnaz and the Airborne Forces, Stackpole/Greenhill, 1993

Airborne units and formations of Russia
Airborne divisions of the Soviet Union
Military education and training in the Soviet Union
Training units and formations of Russia